The Complete Guitarist is a compilation album by British musician Davey Graham, released in 1978. It was reissued on CD in 1999 with eight bonus tracks from 1979-1980 added.

Reception

In his Allmusic review, critic Alex Henderson wrote "To those who are unfamiliar with Davey Graham's work, The Complete Guitarist might seem like a lofty title for this album. But it's a title that the Scottish musician, who has commanded a lot of respect in U.K. folk circles since emerging in the 1960s, lives up to on these unaccompanied acoustic solo-guitar recordings from the late 1970s... Whether it's Celtic music, classical, blues, or jazz, Graham has no problem tackling a variety of styles and demonstrating that he really is the complete guitarist."

Track listing 
All songs by Davey Graham unless otherwise noted.
 "Lord Mayo/Lord Inchiquin" (Traditional) – 4:30
 "Lashtal's Room" (Davey Graham) – 1:59
 "Ein feste Burg – 1:29
 "The Rod to Lisdoonvana" (Traditional) – 1:58
 "Renaissance Piece" (Traditional) – 1:50
 "Hardman the Fiddler" (Traditional) – 1:39
 "Sarah" – 3:55
 "Frieze Britches" (Traditional) – 3:00
 "Blues for Gino" (Davy Graham) – 2:56
 "The Hunter's Purse" (Traditional) – 1:25
 "Prelude from the Suite in D Minor" (Robert de Visée) – 1:02
 "Fairies' Hornpipe" (Traditional) – 1:30
 "Forty Ton Parachute" (Davy Graham) – 1:28
 "The Gold Ring" (Traditional) – 2:20
 "Down Ampney" (Vaughan Williams) – 0:49
 "Banish Misfortune" (Traditional) – 1:52
 1999 reissue bonus tracks:
 "Dance for Two People" (Stanley Albert Watson) – 2:12
 "Bloody Fields of Flanders" (Alex Stuart) – 1:36
 "Happy Meeting in Glory" (Traditional) – 2:00
 "Farewell to the Creeks" (James Robertson) – 1:27
 "Mná na hÉireann (Women of Ireland)" (Traditional) – 3:29
 "Panic Room Blue" (Robertson) – 2:39
 "How Come You Do Me Like You Do?" (Willie Dixon, Memphis Slim) – 2:39
 "When I Been Drinking" (Big Bill Broonzy)– 2:00

Personnel 
 Davey Graham – vocals, guitar
Production notes:
 Stefan Grossman – producer
 John Renbourn – producer
 Nic Kinsey – engineer
 Joe Tarantino – remastering
 Deb Sibony – design
 Jamie Putnam – art direction
 Duck Baker – liner notes

References 

Davey Graham albums
1978 compilation albums
Kicking Mule Records albums